David Haziot (born 1947 in Casablanca) is a French writer. Holder of a Master of Philosophy at the Sorbonne on the cinema of Sergei Eisenstein, he then turned to fiction, biography, and essay. He obtained a prize of the Académie Française for his biography of Vincent van Gogh and the Prix Goncourt de la Biographie for his latest work about the Rouart family.

Publications 
 Tome 1 : Fille de l'ombre, April 1989.
 Tome 2 : L'autre rive, July 1989.
 Tome 3 : La chair des dieux, October 1989
 2000: Le Vin de la Liberté, Roman, Robert Laffont, Prix littéraire de l'Académie du Vin de Bordeaux en 2000, Prix du roman historique en 2001 aux Rendez-vous de l'Histoire à Blois. 
 2004: Elles, novel, Autrement, .
 2007: Château Pichon-Longueville comtesse de Lalande, La passion du vin, historical monography, Photographs by Anne Garde, La Martinière, .
 2007: Van Gogh, Biography, Gallimard-Folio, Prix de l'Académie française, Médaille de vermeil, 2008.
 2010: Théâtre d'ombres, novel, Denoël, 
 2012: Le Roman des Rouart (1850-2000), Biographie, Fayard, Prix Goncourt de la biographie 2012
 2013: Cercles 1991 - 2011, trilingual text (French, English, German) for the catalog of the Gary Fabian Miller exhibition, Paris October 2013.
 2013: Voyage à Auschwitz, Le démon de la certitude. e-book, August 2013. English translation by Anna Harrison Voyage to Auschwitz, The demon of certainty. e-book, February 2014.
 2014: Preface for the book Van Gogh, Pour planer au-dessus de la vie by Karin Müller, Éditions Michel de Maule, May 2014.
 2014: Repères biographiques (Henri Rouart, Ernest Rouart, Augustin Rouart), in Les Rouart, de l’impressionnisme au réalisme magique, work under the direction of Dominique Bona, with texts by Jean-Marie Rouart, Frédéric Vitoux, David Haziot, Charles Villeneuve de Janti, Paul Valéry and Léon-Paul Fargue, Éditions Gallimard, Paris, October 2014.
 2016: L’insoumise, Tome 1 : Les Eaux de Lune, comic novel set in Italy in the sixteenth, with collaboration by François Baranger (drawings), La Mare aux Loups, February 2016.

See also 
 Château Cos d'Estournel
 Château Pichon Longueville Comtesse de Lalande

References 

20th-century French writers
21st-century French writers
French biographers
Prix Goncourt de la Biographie winners
People from Casablanca
1947 births
Living people